The 2014 New Zealand general election took place on Saturday 20 September 2014 to determine the membership of the 51st New Zealand Parliament.

Voters elected 121 members to the House of Representatives, with 71 from single-member electorates (an increase from 70 in 2011) and 49 from party lists. Since 1996, New Zealand has used the Mixed Member Proportional (MMP) voting system, giving voters two votes: one for a political party and one for their local electorate MP. The party vote decides how many seats each party gets in the new Parliament; a party is entitled to a share of the seats if it receives 5% of the party vote or wins an electorate. Normally, the House has 120 seats but extra seats may be added where there is an overhang, caused by a party winning more electorates than seats it is entitled to. The one-seat overhang from the 50th Parliament remained for the 51st Parliament, after United Future won one electorate when their 0.22% party vote did not entitle them to any seats.

A total of 3,140,417 people were registered to vote in the election; around 92.6% of all eligible New Zealanders. A total of 2,446,279 votes were cast, including a record 717,579 advance votes, more than double the number cast in 2011. Turnout was 77.90%, higher than the 2011 election, but the sixth-lowest since women gained the vote in 1893.

The centre-right National Party, led by incumbent Prime Minister John Key, gained a plurality with 47.0% of the party vote and 60 of the 121 seats. On election night counts, the party appeared to hold the first majority since 1994 with 61 seats, but lost one seat to the Green Party on the official count. National re-entered confidence and supply agreements with the centrist United Future, the neoliberal ACT Party, and the indigenous rights-based Māori Party to form a minority government and give the Fifth National Government a third term. This was the most recent election in which a National Party member was appointed prime minister.

The centre-left Labour Party, National's traditional opponent, lost ground for the fourth election in a row, receiving 25.1% of the party vote and 32 seats. The Green Party dropped in the party vote from 11.1% to 10.7%, but remained steady on 14 seats. New Zealand First meanwhile increased its vote share to 8.7% and seat count to 11. The Māori Party, ACT, and United Future retained their Parliamentary representation, despite losing party votes.

Background

MMP review 

A referendum on the voting system took place in conjunction with the 2011 election, with 57.8% of voters voting to keep the existing Mixed Member Proportional (MMP) voting system. Under the terms of the Electoral Referendum Act 2010 the majority vote in favour of retaining MMP meant that the Electoral Commission had the task of conducting an independent review of the workings of the MMP system.

The Commission released a consultation paper in February 2012 calling for public submissions on ways to improve the MMP system, with the focus put on six areas:

 basis of eligibility for list seats (thresholds)
 by-election candidates
 dual candidacy
 order of candidates on party lists
 overhang
 proportion of electorate seats to list seats

The Commission released a proposal paper for consultation in August 2012 and published its final report on 29 October 2012. In the report, the Commission recommended the following:
 Reducing the party vote threshold from 5 percent to 4 percent. If introduced, the 4 percent threshold should be reviewed after three general elections.
 Abolishing the one electorate seat threshold – a party must cross the party vote threshold to gain list seats.
 Abolishing the provision of overhang seats for parties not reaching the threshold – the extra electorates would be made up at the expense of list seats to retain 120 MPs
 Retaining the status quo for by-election candidacy and dual candidacy.
 Retaining the status quo with closed party lists, but increasing scrutiny in selection of list candidates to ensure parties comply with their own party rules.
 Parliament should give consideration to fixing the ratio between electorate seats and list seats at 60:40 (72:48 in a 120-seat parliament).

In November 2012 a private member's bill under the name of opposition Labour Party member Iain Lees-Galloway proposed implementing the first two recommendations; it was drawn from the member's bill ballot on 14 November 2013, but by the time Parliament dissolved for the election, it was still awaiting its first reading.
In May 2014 Judith Collins and John Key announced that no inter-party consensus existed on implementing the recommendations of the Commission, so the Government would not introduce any legislation.

50th Parliament (2011–14)

Following the 2011 general election, the National Party entered into confidence and supply agreements with ACT, the Māori Party and United Future to continue the Fifth National Government. These arrangements give the National-led government a majority of seven seats, with 64 on confidence-and-supply in the 121-seat Parliament.

The Labour, Green, New Zealand First and Mana parties are all in opposition, but only the Labour Party constitutes the formal Opposition.

At the 2011 election, the National Party gained 59 seats, the Labour Party 34 seats, the Green Party 14 seats, New Zealand First eight seats, Māori three seats, and Mana, ACT, and United Future gained one seat each. One change was made to the allocation during the Parliament. In 2012, Brendan Horan was expelled from the NZ First caucus but continued to sit as an Independent, meaning NZ First had seven caucus MPs for the remainder of the Parliament.

On 31 May 2013, the Electoral Commission de-registered United Future after it could not prove it had the 500 financial members required for registration. The party successfully re-registered on 13 August 2013, but in the interim its sole MP, Peter Dunne, sat in the house as an independent. On 13 June 2014, ACT's sole MP John Banks resigned from Parliament after being found guilty of filing a false electoral return for his 2010 Auckland mayoral campaign. As his resignation came within six months of the election, his seat was left vacant, meaning ACT had no representation in Parliament until the general election.

Dates
On 10 March 2014, Prime Minister John Key announced that the election would take place on Saturday 20 September 2014. As in 2011, the Prime Minister announced the date early, although only six months in advance compared to the nearly ten months in 2011. Traditionally, the election date is a closely guarded secret, and announced as late as possible.

A general election must take place every three years, and Parliaments generally run the full three-year term unless an early election is called or the election date is set to circumvent holding a by-election. Voting for the previous election occurred on Saturday, 26 November 2011. If the convention had been followed in 2014, the election would have taken place on 29 November.

In October 2013, Prime Minister John Key hinted that the election would take place before November. The setting of the election date became further influenced by Australia inviting New Zealand to attend the G20 summit in Brisbane on 15 and 16 November 2014, with the possibility that some leaders might make flying visits to New Zealand. Ideally, major diplomatic visits and engagements should be avoided during the election period, as they can distract politicians from campaigning and voters may see them as an attempt to influence the election result.

Key dates relating to the General Election include:

Electorate boundaries
Per the Electoral Act 1993, the South Island must have 16 general electorates, with the number of North Island general and Maori electorates calculated by dividing the respective population in each group by one-sixteenth of the South Island general electorate population, within a tolerance of five percent. At the 2011 election, the North Island had 47 general electorates and the Maori roll had seven Māori electorates, totalling 70 electorates across the country. Following the March 2013 New Zealand census and the 2013 Maori electoral option, the Representation Commission re-drew some electorate boundaries.

In October 2013, Statistics New Zealand announced that there would be one additional North Island general electorate, bringing the total number of North Island general electorates to 48 and the overall number of electorates to 71. Growth in Auckland saw three existing electorates, Auckland Central, Helensville and Hunua, exceed their quota by at least 14 percent. Population changes in Christchurch following the 2011 earthquakes meanwhile saw the Christchurch East electorate drop to 23 percent below quota, while the urban fringe electorate of Selwyn grew to 14 percent above quota.

The Representation Commission, tasked with redrawing the electorate boundaries, released its final electorate boundaries on 17 April 2014. The largest changes took place in northern and western Auckland, with two new electorates –  and  – created, while the existing  electorate was dissolved. Upper Harbour centres on the Upper Harbour Bridge, stretching from Wairau Valley to Massey, and was predicted to be a safe National seat. Kelston centres on the western Auckland suburb of the same name, stretching from Oratia to Waterview, and was predicted to be a safe Labour seat. Kelston's creation took population from the Mount Albert electorate, which in turn allowed Mount Albert to take Westmere and Grey Lynn from Auckland Central, bringing Auckland Central within quota.

While it was correctly predicted Christchurch East would remain a Labour seat, the prediction that the marginal Christchurch Central electorate would move in Labour's favour proved false; the seat instead swung in National's favour. The loss of Labour-leaning urban parts of Waimakariri made it a safer seat for National, which increased it majority from 642 votes in 2011 to 2,133 in 2014. The Halswell-Oaklands-Westmorland area moved from Selwyn into Port Hills to compensate for Port Hills' loss and to bring Selwyn within quota. As Halswell-Oaklands-Westmorland are predominantly National-leaning, it caused the Labour-held electorate of Port Hills to become more marginal.

The changes allowed Ōhariu to take Wadestown off the over-quota Wellington Central electorate. This was correctly predicted to make Hutt South more marginal; Labour's Trevor Mallard retained the seat in 2011 by a 4825-vote majority, and this reduced to just 709 in 2014, while Rimutaka's Chris Hipkins increased his majority by 3,378 votes.

Retiring MPs
Twenty-two existing Members of Parliament did not stand for re-election, including fourteen members of the governing National Party.

List-only MPs
Bill English (National) announced in January 2014 that he would retire as the electorate MP for Clutha-Southland and he instead stood as a list-only MP.

Contesting parties and candidates

At the close of nominations, 554 individuals had been nominated to contest the election, up from 544 at the 2011 election. Of those, 71 were list-only, 114 were electorate-only (including 13 candidates from non-registered parties and 23 independent candidates), and 369 contested for both list and electorate seats. Just under 30% of candidates (164) were female, up from 27% in 2011.

Political parties registered with the Electoral Commission on Writ Day can contest the general election as a party. Each such party can submit a party list to contest the party vote, and can have a party election-expenses limit in addition to limits on individual candidates' campaigns. At Writ Day, 19 political parties had registered to contend the general election. At the close of nominations, 15 registered parties had put forward a party list to the Commission to contest the party vote, up from 13 in 2011.

On 27 May 2014, the Mana Party and Internet Party announced an agreement to field a combined party list at the election under the Internet Mana Party banner. Their electorate candidates, however, can continue to campaign under each individual party's banner.

While registered, the 1Law4All Party and the Alliance did not put forward party lists.

Non-registered parties contending the election include:
 Climate Party (Auckland Central, Rongotai)
 Communist League (Manukau East, Maungakiekie)
 Economic Euthenics Party (Wigram)
 Expatriate Party (Ikaroa-Rāwhiti)
 Human Rights Party (Mount Albert)
 Money Free Party (Auckland Central, Kaikōura, Nelson, Northland, West Coast-Tasman)
 Patriotic Revolutionary Front (Rongotai)

Independents are standing in Botany, Dunedin North (×2), Epsom (×4), Helensville (×2), Hutt South, Mount Albert, Northland, Ōhariu, Ōtaki, Rongotai, Tauranga (×2), Wellington Central, West Coast-Tasman, Ikaroa-Rāwhiti, Tāmaki Makaurau and Te Tai Tokerau.

Campaigning

Campaign expense limits and broadcasting allocations
During the three-month regulated period prior to election day (i.e. 20 June to 19 September 2014), parties and candidates have limits on how much they may spend on election campaigning. It is illegal in New Zealand to campaign on election day itself.

For the 2014 election, every registered party contending the party vote is permitted to spend $1,091,000 plus $25,700 per electorate candidate on election campaigning during the regulated period, excluding radio and television campaigning (broadcasting funding is allocated separately). A party contesting all 71 electorates is therefore permitted to spend $2,915,700 on election campaigning. All electorate candidates are permitted to spend $25,700 each on campaigning over and above their party's allocation.

Registered parties are allocated a separate broadcasting budget for radio and television campaigning, and broadcasting time on Radio New Zealand and Television New Zealand to make opening and closing addresses. Only money from the broadcasting allocation can be used to purchase airtime; the actual production costs of advertisements can come from the general election expenses budget.

The Electoral Commission sets the amount of broadcasting funds and time each party gets. The initial election broadcasting allocation was announced on 6 June 2014. Two parties who were allocated broadcasting funds and time failed to register by Writ Day, so their funding and allocation of time for closing address were redistributed to the remaining parties. ACT did not receive any redistributed funding as they had lost their only MP since the initial allocation. Broadcasting funding was further redistributed on 29 August after the Alliance failed to register its party list (a requirement to receive broadcasting funds). This coincided with the Conservative Party's bid to receive a court-mandated increase in broadcasting funds and time, which was taken into consideration when funding was redistributed for the second time.

Third party promoters, such as trade unions and lobby groups, can campaign during the regulated period. The maximum expense limit is $308,000 for those groups registered with the Electoral Commission, and $12,300 for unregistered groups. Those third party promoters registered for the election include:

 ActionStation
 Campaign 4 Change
 Dairy Workers Union
 Engineering, Printing and Manufacturing Union
 Family First
 Federated Mountain Clubs of New Zealand
 Financial Services Council
 First Union New Zealand
 Jill Whitmore
 Living Wage Movement Aotearoa New Zealand
 Maritime Union of New Zealand
 New Zealand Aged Care Association
 New Zealand Council of Trade Unions
 New Zealand Educational Institute
 New Zealand Nurses Organisation
 New Zealand Post Primary Teachers' Association
 New Zealand Union of Students' Associations
 The Opinion Partnership
 Pitt Street Methodist Church
 Public Service Association
 Service and Food Workers Union
 Unite Union

All campaign expense limits are inclusive of GST.

Campaigning timeline

Early campaigning: before 20 August
 20 July – Election hoardings and billboards begin to appear.
 31 July – The 50th New Zealand Parliament concludes with the adjournment debate.
 10 August – Labour officially launches its election campaign in Auckland, making a promise of free GP visits and prescriptions to pregnant women and those aged under 13 and over 65.
 13 August – Nicky Hager releases the book Dirty Politics, based on leaked e-mails from blogger Cameron Slater, alleging various ways National Party figures participated in Slater's "attack politics." Among other claims, Hager suggests one of John Key's staff members accessed the Labour Party online database, which journalist John Armstrong compared to the Watergate break-in.

First week: 20–24 August
 20 August – Writ Day: radio and television advertising begins.
 22 August – The party radio opening addresses air on Radio New Zealand National at 20:06.
 23 August – The party television opening addresses air on TV One at 19:00.
 24 August
 National officially launches its election campaign in South Auckland. It promises to allow KiwiSaver members to withdraw member tax credits to help buy a first home, double the KiwiSaver first home deposit subsidy, and increase the limit on house prices to qualify for the subsidy.
 Internet Mana officially launches its election campaign in Auckland. Kim Dotcom makes a comment that he once hacked the German credit rating system and put the Prime Minister's rating to zero because he "didn't like the guy." When interviewed, Internet Party press secretary Pam Corkery intervenes, calling reporter Brook Sabin a "puffed-up little shit".

Second week: 25–31 August
 27 August – The National and Conservative parties admit they had installed motion-activated cameras to monitor their election hoardings, which had been subject to persistent vandalism. Among the more creative vandalism are Labour Auckland Central candidate Jacinda Ardern as a pirate and Conservative leader Colin Craig as a member of KISS.
 28 August – The first TVNZ leaders' debate between John Key and David Cunliffe takes place.
 30 August – Judith Collins resigns as a minister due to recurring controversies throughout her tenure as Minister of Justice. Her resignation comes following an accusation by Winston Peters that her office came to him with a possible leadership challenge against John Key, and the revelation of an e-mail from blogger Cameron Slater in 2011 that suggests Collins may have undermined a Director of the Serious Fraud Office.

Third week: 1–7 September
 2 September – The Press leaders' debate between John Key and David Cunliffe takes place in Christchurch. Key claims a win after Cunliffe could not answer whether family homes held in a trust would be exempt under Labour's capital gains tax policy.
 3 September – Advance voting opens, with Labour leader David Cunliffe and Internet Party founder Kim Dotcom among the first to vote.
 5 September – The TVNZ multi-party leaders' debate takes place. The leaders participating are Russel Norman (Green), Winston Peters (NZ First), Peter Dunne (United Future), Te Ururoa Flavell (Māori), Hone Harawira (Internet Mana), Jamie Whyte (ACT), Brendan Horan (NZIC) and Colin Craig (Conservative).
 7 September – ACT officially launches its election campaign at Ellerslie, Auckland, making promises to repeal the Resource Management Act and abolish the Overseas Investment Office if elected.

Fourth week: 8–14 September

 8 September – An expletive-filled email is sent by Mana Party leader Hone Harawira to party members. In it, Harawira claims the Internet Party is putting too many resources into promoting cannabis law reform rather than into Mana's flagship policy of providing breakfast and lunch to students at low socio-economic decile schools.
 10 September
 The TV3 leaders' debate between John Key and David Cunliffe takes place.
 The Electoral Commission announces it will not allow photography in polling booths, after several incidents where advance voters had taken selfies with their completed ballot paper or behind voting screens and posted them to social media. Posting an image of a completed ballot paper within 3 days of election day is illegal, and can attract a $20,000 fine.

Final week: 15–19 September

 15 September
 The Internet Party organises "The Moment of Truth", an event held in Auckland to release information related to New Zealand's involvement in the Five Eyes network. Kim Dotcom, Glenn Greenwald, Edward Snowden and Julian Assange all participate.
 A Māori Television Reid Research poll of the  electorate is released, showing Labour candidate Kelvin Davis on 37%, only one percent behind incumbent Mana Party leader Hone Harawira. Harawira is relying on an electorate win to allow Internet Mana to enter Parliament without needing to get 5% of the party vote.
 16 September – The publishers for US rapper Eminem files a lawsuit with the Wellington High Court, alleging the National Party had infringed copyright by using an instrumental version of the song "Lose Yourself" in its television advertisements without permission. The party rejects the lawsuit, with campaign manager Steven Joyce saying the song was "pretty legal", having been purchased from an Australian music library.
 17 September – The second TVNZ leaders' debate between John Key and David Cunliffe takes place. Key reiterates for supporters not to split the party vote, saying "If you want steak for dinner tonight, go and buy steak; don't buy a lamb chop. If you want a National government, party vote National." Cunliffe says he would work with the Greens and NZ First after the election, which based on the 3 News Reid Research poll released the same day would out-poll National and its "ragtag bunch of right-wing weirdos". Both leaders ruled out working with the Internet Mana Party after the election.
 18 September
 Conservative leader Colin Craig's press secretary, Rachel MacGregor, resigns, allegedly calling Craig a "manipulative man". Craig only learns about the resignation when questioned about it by the media, and says the resignation most likely relates to burnout.
 National leader John Key and NZ First leader Winston Peters publicly endorse Labour candidate Kelvin Davis in Te Tai Tokerau. In response, incumbent Hone Harawira says that National and NZ First are trying to sway the election against the wishes of voters.
 19 September – Last day of campaigning. Party closing addresses air on TV One at 19:30 and Radio New Zealand National at 20:06.

Opinion polling

Opinion polls have been undertaken periodically since the 2011 election by Fairfax Media (Fairfax Media Ipsos), MediaWorks New Zealand (3 News Reid Research), The New Zealand Herald (Herald Digipoll), Roy Morgan Research, and Television New Zealand (One News Colmar Brunton). The graph on the left below shows the collated results of all five polls for parties that polled above the 5% electoral threshold at the 2011 election; The graph on the right shows results for parties that polled between 1% and 4.9%, or won an electorate seat, at the 2011 election, as well as parties contesting the 2014 election which have polled over 1.0% since 2011.

After the November 2011 election, National remained around the 47% mark in polling until the end of 2013, when its popularity slowly rose to 49% by the last week before the election. Labour recovered from its 27.5% election result to cross the 30% mark in March 2012, before levelling out around 33% for most of 2013. From around November 2013, Labour's support started slipping, down to 25% by election day. The Green Party and New Zealand First did not move much from the 11% and 5% marks respectively until the last few weeks before the election, where they each gained 1–2%. No other party has polled above the 5% threshold, although the Conservative Party came close on individual polls in the weeks before the election.

Results
Preliminary results were gradually released after 19:00 (NZST) on 20 September, with the targets that all advance vote results were available by 20:30 and all preliminary results were available by 23:30. The preliminary count is done within the polling booths, and only includes ordinary votes; it does not include any special votes. Special votes include votes from those who enrolled after the deadline on 20 August, those who voted outside their electorate (this includes all overseas votes), hospital votes, and those voters enrolled on the unpublished roll.

All voting papers, counterfoils and electoral rolls are returned to the electorate's returning officer for a compulsory recount; this also includes approving and counting any special votes, and compiling a master roll to ensure no voter has voted more than once. Official results, including all recounted ordinary votes and special votes, were released at 14:00 on Saturday 4 October 2014. Parties and candidates had 3 working days afterwards (i.e. until 8 October 2014) to apply to the District Court for a judicial recount.

On 7 October 2014, Mana Party leader Hone Harawira filed for a judicial recount of the Te Tai Tokerau electorate. The recount was taken under the auspices of Judge TJ Broadmore at the Kaitaia District Court on 8 and 9 October, and apart from a few minor changes in vote tallies, the official result was upheld.

Overall results

| colspan=12 align=center| 
|- style="text-align:center;"
! colspan=2 rowspan=2 style="width:213px;" | Party
! Colspan=3 | Party vote
! Colspan=3 | Electorate vote
! Colspan=4 | Seats
|- style="text-align:center;"
! Votes
! %
! Change(pp)
! Votes
! %
! Change(pp)
! List
! Electorate
! Total
! +/-
|-
| 

| 1,131,501
| 47.04
| 0.28
| 1,081,787
| 46.08
| 1.23
| 19
| 41
| 60
| 1
|-
| 
| 604,535
| 25.13
| 2.35
| 801,287
| 34.13
| 0.99
| 5
| 27
| 32
| 2
|-
| 
| 257,359
| 10.70
| 0.36
| 165,718
| 7.06
| 0.10
| 14
| 0
| 14
| 
|-
| 
| 208,300
| 8.66
| 2.06
| 73,384
| 3.13
| 1.29
| 11
| 0
| 11
| 3
|-
| 
| 31,849
| 1.32
| 0.11
| 42,108
| 1.79
| 0.02
| 1
| 1
| 2
| 1
|-
| 
| 16,689
| 0.69
| 0.37
| 27,778
| 1.18
| 0.25
| 0
| 1
| 1
| 
|-
| 
| 5,286
| 0.22
| 0.38
| 14,722
| 0.63
| 0.24
| 0
| 1
| 1
| 
|-
| 
| 95,598
| 3.97
| 1.32
| 81,075
| 3.45
| 1.07
| 0
| 0
| 0
| 
|-
| 
| 34,094
| 1.42
| 0.34
| 37,181
| 1.58
| 0.20
| 0
| 0
| 0
| 1
|-
| 

| 10,961
| 0.46
| 0.07
| 4,936
| 0.21
| 0.08
| 0
| 0
| 0
| 
|-
| 
| 5,113
| 0.21
| new
| 4,448
| 0.19
| new
| 0
| 0
| 0
| new
|-
| 
| 1,730
| 0.07
| 0.01
| 4,647
| 0.20
| 0.10
| 0
| 0
| 0
| 
|-
| 
| 1,096
| 0.05
| new
| —
| —
| —
| 
| 0
| 0
| new
|-
| 

| 872
| 0.04
| new
| 1,929
| 0.08
| new
| 0
| 0
| 0
| new
|-
| 
| 639
| 0.03
| new
| 1,797
| 0.08
| new
| 0
| 0
| 0
| new
|-
| 
| —
| —
| 0.05
| 59
| 0.00
| 0.06
| 0
| 0
| 0
| 
|-
| style="background-color:#ffffff" |
| style="text-align:left;" |Unregistered Parties
| —
| —
| —
| 887
| 0.04
| 0.03
| 0
| 0
| 0
| 
|-
| 
| —
| —
| —
| 3,864
| 0.16
| 0.03
| 0
| 0
| 0
| 
|-
! colspan=2 style="text-align:left;" | Valid votes
! 2,405,622
! 98.34
! 0.16
! 2,347,607
! 95.97
! 0.65
! Colspan=4 |
|-
| colspan=2 style="text-align:left;" | Informal votes

| 10,857
| 0.44
| 0.43
| 27,886
| 1.14
| 1.20
| Colspan=4 |
|-
| colspan=2 style="text-align:left;" | Disallowed votes
| 29,818
| 1.22
| 0.29
| 70,804
| 2.89
| 0.55
| Colspan=4 |
|-
| colspan=2 style="text-align:left;" | Below electoral threshold
| 150,103
| 6.14
| —
| —
| —
| —
| Colspan=4 |
|-
! colspan=2 style="text-align:left;" | Total
! 2,446,297
! 100
!
! 2,446,297
! 100
!
! 50
! 71
! 121
!
|-
| colspan=2 style="text-align:left;" | Eligible voters and Turnout
| 3,140,417
| 77.90
| 3.96
| 3,140,417
| 77.90
| 3.96
| Colspan=4 |
|}

Non-parliamentary parties
Eight parties did not gain 5% of the party vote or win an electorate seat, entitling them to no representation in the 51st Parliament.

Despite speculation that the Conservative Party might cross the 5% threshold, it did not; nonetheless, it secured an increase in its share of the party vote, winning just under 4.0%. The Aotearoa Legalise Cannabis Party received 0.46% of the vote, twice as many as the lowest-polling party to gain a seat, United Future.

Voting summary

Electorate results

Prior to the election, the National Party held the majority of the electorate seats with 41. Labour held 22 seats, Māori held three seats, and ACT, Mana and United Future held one seat each.

National held steady on 41 electorates, Labour gained three seats to hold 27 electorates, Māori lost two seats to hold one, and ACT and United Future held steady with one seat each. The Mana Party lost its only seat, after sole incumbent MP Hone Harawira lost  to Labour's Kelvin Davis.

In the two new electorates, Labour's Carmel Sepuloni won Kelston, while National's Paula Bennett won Upper Harbour. Bennett previously held , which was disestablished prior to the election in favour of the two new electorates.

In 11 electorates, the incumbents did not seek re-election, and the seats passed to new MPs of the same party. In the remaining 3 electorates where the incumbent did not seek re-election, the electorate changed allegiance. In , Labour's Stuart Nash won the seat off retiring National MP Chris Tremain, caused by large vote splitting between National candidate Wayne Walford and Conservative candidate Garth McVicar.

Of the 55 electorates where the incumbents sought re-election, only the aforementioned Te Tai Tokerau changed hands.

The table below shows the results of the 2014 general election:

Key:

|-
 | colspan =10 style="background-color:#FFDEAD" | Māori electorates
|-

|}

Notes:

List results

Party vote by electorate

The following is a breakdown of the party vote received in each electorate. Only parties that polled over 5 percent in at least one electorate are included.

Successful list MPs

Unsuccessful list candidates

Changes in MPs
In total, 23 new MPs were elected to Parliament and 4 former, non-sitting MPs returned. Eight MPs stood and were not re-elected.

In addition Bill English went from being an electorate MP to a list MP, while Kelvin Davis went from being a list MP to an electorate MP.

New MPs
Darroch Ball, Todd Barclay, Andrew Bayly, Mahesh Bindra, Chris Bishop, Matt Doocey, Sarah Dowie, Marama Fox, Peeni Henare, Brett Hudson, Barbara Kuriger, Clayton Mitchell, Todd Muller, Jono Naylor, Parmjeet Parmar, Shane Reti, Adrian Rurawhe, Jenny Salesa, Alastair Scott, David Seymour, James Shaw, Stuart Smith, Fletcher Tabuteau

Returning MPs
Ron Mark, Stuart Nash, Pita Paraone, Carmel Sepuloni

Defeated MPs
Carol Beaumont, Hone Harawira, Brendan Horan, Raymond Huo, Asenati Taylor, Moana Mackey, Maryan Street, Holly Walker (Electorate only, not the Green Party List)

Demographics of elected MPs

Electoral expenses
The Electoral Commission released party electoral expense returns on 23 February 2015, stating how much each party spent on campaigning between 20 June and 19 September 2014. Candidate only expenses were excluded.

Post-election events

Leadership changes

On 30 September 2014, Labour leader David Cunliffe stepped down and forced a party leadership election. Andrew Little won leadership of the Labour Party,

Local by-elections
Two sitting mayors of local councils were elected: Jono Naylor (National) of Palmerston North City and Ron Mark (NZ First) of Carterton District. Both announced they would stand down as mayors if elected to Parliament, resulting in by-elections being called in Palmerston North and Carterton.

Nominations for the Palmerston North mayoral by-election close on 22 December 2014, with the by-election taking place on 10 February 2015 if needed. Carterton's incumbent deputy mayor, John Booth, was elected mayor unopposed on 28 October 2014.

Financial market reaction
Within an hour of the New Zealand Exchange opening on Monday 22 September, the headline NZX 50 Index jumped 1.27%, led by the country's five main electricity generator-retailers: Contact Energy, Genesis Energy, Meridian Energy, Mighty River Power and TrustPower. During the previous Parliament, the National Party partially privatised Genesis, Meridian and Mighty River, reducing the Crown's share from 100% to 51%. In response, the Labour and Green parties promised to reform the wholesale electricity market if elected, which would have provided cheaper retail prices by cutting how much generators could profit off their wholesale prices.

Election offences
Under section 197(1g) of the Electoral Act 1993, it is illegal for any person to publish anything that may influence voters to vote in a particular way between 00:00 and 19:00 on election day. The rule applies equally to traditional media and social media, and those found breaking the rule can be fined up to $20,000. After the election, 24 people were caught out by the rule and referred to Police. Among those were former All Black Jonah Lomu, current All Black Israel Dagg, and Olympic rowing medallist Eric Murray, who were caught tweeting their support for the National Party during the gag period.

A complaint was made against the Civilian Party for failure to include a promoter statement on their Facebook page as required by section 204F of the Electoral Act. Ben Uffindell, Party Leader, noted that the omission of the promoter statement was inadvertent and immediately placed a promoter statement onto the page after being instructed to do so by the Electoral Commission.

Notes

Further reading

References

External links

 Election coverage at The New Zealand Herald
 Election coverage at Radio New Zealand National
 Election coverage at Television New Zealand